The 1914–15 season was Madrid Football Club's 13th season in existence. The club played some friendly matches. They also played in the Campeonato Regional Centro (Central Regional Championship).

Friendlies

Competitions

Overview

Campeonato Regional Centro

League table

Matches

References

External links
Realmadrid.com Official Site
1914–15 Squad
1914–15 matches
1914–15 (Campeonato de Madrid)
International Friendlies of Real Madrid CF - Overview

Real Madrid
Real Madrid CF seasons